Tarsem Singh Kular (9 December 1946 – 28 November 2005) was an Indian field hockey player. He was born in Sansarpur, Punjab. He won a bronze medal at the 1968 Summer Olympics in Mexico City.

References

External links
 

1946 births
2005 deaths
Indian male field hockey players
Olympic field hockey players of India
Olympic bronze medalists for India
Olympic medalists in field hockey
Medalists at the 1968 Summer Olympics
Field hockey players at the 1968 Summer Olympics
Asian Games medalists in field hockey
Field hockey players at the 1966 Asian Games
Field hockey players from Jalandhar
Asian Games gold medalists for India
Medalists at the 1966 Asian Games